This is a list of Billboard magazine's Top Hot 100 songs of 1980.

See also
1980 in music
List of Billboard Hot 100 number-one singles of 1980
List of Billboard Hot 100 top-ten singles in 1980

References

1980 record charts
Billboard charts